Achatinellidae is a family of tropical air-breathing land snails, terrestrial pulmonate gastropod mollusks in the superfamily Pupilloidea.

Taxonomy 
It was previously the only family in the superfamily Achatinelloidea (according to the taxonomy of the Gastropoda by Bouchet & Rocroi, 2005). It is now classified under the superfamily Pupilloidea.

The family Achatinellidae represents a diverse adaptive radiation. All species of tree-snail in Hawaii are believed to have come from a single ancestral snail. How that ancestral snail made the  trip across the ocean is unknown. A longstanding theory is that a bird carried a notably smaller ancestor across the ocean and dropped it on the islands, as bird mediated dispersal has been documented in other snail species. Alternative theories include that it floating across the ocean on a mat of debris, or that it island hopped across the Pacific in a combination of the theories.

Subfamilies in the family Achatinellidae include:
 Achatinellinae Gulick, 1873 - synonym: Helicterinae Pease, 1870 (inv.)
 Auriculellinae Odhner, 1921
 Elasmatininae Iredale, 1937
 tribe Elasmatinini Iredale, 1937 - synonyms: Strobilidae Zilch, 1959 (n.a.); Pitysinae Cooke & Kondo, 1961
 tribe Antonellini Cooke & Kondo, 1961
 tribe Tubuaiini Cooke & Kondo, 1961
 Pacificellinae Steenberg, 1925
 tribe Pacificellini Steenberg, 1925 - synonym: Tornatellinoptini Cooke & Kondo, 1961
 tribe Lamellideini Cooke & Kondo, 1961
 Tekoulininae Solem, 1972
 Tornatellidinae Cooke & Kondo, 1961
 tribe Tornatellidini Cooke & Kondo, 1961
 tribe Tornatellariini Cooke & Kondo, 1961
 Tornatellininae Sykes, 1900
 tribe Tornatellinini Sykes, 1900
 tribe Elasmiatini Kuroda & Habe, 1949

Anatomy 
In this family, the number of haploid chromosomes lies between 16 and 25 (according to the values in the table).

Distribution 
This family of snails occurs widely in the Pacific islands. They are at their most diverse in the Hawaiian group.

Genera 
Genera in the family Achatinellidae include:

Achatinellinae
 Achatinella Swainson, 1828 - type genus of the subfamily Achatinellinae
 Partulina Pfeiffer, 1854
 Perdicella Pease, 1870
 Newcombia Pfeiffer, 1854

Auriculellinae
 Auriculella Pfeiffer, 1854 - type genus of the subfamily Auriculellinae

Elasmatininae
 tribe Elasmatinini
 tribe Antonellini
 tribe Tubuaiini
 Tubuaia

Pacificellinae
 tribe Pacificellini
 Tornatellinops Pilsbry & Cooke, 1915
 tribe Lamellideini
 Lamellidea Pilsbry, 1910

Tekoulininae

Tornatellidinae
 tribe Tornatellidini
 Tornatellides Pilsbry, 1910 - type genus of the tribe Tornatellidini
 tribe Tornatellariini
 Tornatellaria Pilsbry, 1910 - type genus of the tribe Tornatellariini

Tornatellininae
 tribe Tornatellinini
 Tornatellina L. Pfeiffer, 1842 - type genus the tribe Tornatellinini
 tribe Elasmiatini
 Elasmias Pilsbry, 1910 - type genus of the tribe Elasmiatini

unsorted
 Gulickia Cooke, 1915
 † Hotumatua Kirch, Christensen & Steadman, 2009 - Hotumatua anakenana Kirch, Christensen & Steadman, 2009
 Tornatellinops Pilsbry, 1915
 Tornelasmias Iredale, 1944

References

External links 

 
Gastropod families